Surapong Kongthep (born 18 January 1979), is a Thai professional footballer coach and former player, who is the co-head coach with Choketawee Promrut of Thai League 1 club Port.

Managerial statistics

Honours

Manager
Individual
Thai League 1 Coach of the Month (3): June 2016, July 2018, October 2019

References

External links
Surapong Kongthep at Soccerway

1979 births
Living people
Surapong Kongthep
Surapong Kongthep
Association football midfielders
Surapong Kongthep